Hulsan, Huobuxun, or Huoluxun Lake may refer  to:

 North Hulsan Lake
 South Hulsan Lake